Mšec is a market town in Rakovník District in the Central Bohemian Region of the Czech Republic. It has about 900 inhabitants.

Geography
It lies in the Džbán range. The Loděnice River flows through the southern part of the territory and supplies a system of several ponds.

History
The first written mention of Mšec is from 1316. Albrecht the Elder of Kolowrat had built here a fortress in 1361, but it was destroyed already in 1388. In 1548, Mšec was first referred to as a market town. With a short break in 1536–1538, the Kolowrat family owned Mšec until 1569. it was then property of the families of Mičán of Klinštejn and Štampach. The greatest development occurred during the rule of Matyáš Štampach, who had built here a school in 1601 and had rebuilt the castle.

After the Battle of White Mountain, properties of the Štampach family were confiscated. From 1662, Mšec was continuously owned by the House of Schwarzenberg.

Sights

The landmark of Mšec is the Church of Saint Catherine of Alexandria. It is a late Baroque building from 1780, which replaced an old Gothic church.

The Mšec Castle was built in the late Renaissance style at the turn of the 16th and 17th centuries, then it was baroque rebuilt in several stages in the 18th century. Neoclassical modification were made in the 19th century. Next to the castle is a castle park.

References

External links

Populated places in Rakovník District
Market towns in the Czech Republic